Shir Ashian (also Romanized as Shīr Āshīān, Shīr Āsheyān, and Shīr Āshīyān) is a village in Qohab-e Sarsar Rural District, Amirabad District, Damghan County, Semnan Province, Iran. At the 2006 census, its population was 20, in 8 families.

Archaeological site Shir Ashian Tepe is located nearby.

References 

Populated places in Damghan County